Lynn Martin is an American markets executive and computer programmer. She is currently serving as the 68th president of the New York Stock Exchange (NYSE).

Having completed degrees from Manhattan College (computer science) and Columbia University (statistics), Martin first joined the workforce as a computer programmer for IBM before eventually working her way up through positions with the London International Financial Futures and Options Exchange and the Intercontinental Exchange. In December 2021, her appointment as president of the NYSE was announced, and she formally began her tenure on January 3, 2022.

Biography 
Lynn Martin grew up in Smithtown, New York. Her father was an electrical engineer. Martin studied computer science and math at Manhattan College, and in 1998, she graduated with a major in computer science and a minor in finance. While working as a computer programmer at IBM for the next three years, Martin started a part-time graduate studies program and completed an MA in Statistics from Columbia University. She began working at the London International Financial Futures and Options Exchange in 2001. After the Intercontinental Exchange (ICE) purchased Interactive Data in 2015, Martin became head of ICE's fixed-income and data business unit.

In December 2021, Martin was announced as the incoming 68th president of the New York Stock Exchange (NYSE), with her predecessor Stacey Cunningham moving onto the NYSE's board of directors. On January 3, 2022, Martin officially began her tenure as president.

Martin is a trustee at Manhattan College and a member of the Phi Beta Kappa society. She is on the board of directors for Partnership for New York City.

References 

American women computer scientists
American women bankers
Manhattan College alumni
Columbia Graduate School of Arts and Sciences alumni
Presidents of the New York Stock Exchange
New York Stock Exchange people
Living people
Year of birth missing (living people)
American computer scientists
American bankers
People from Smithtown, New York
Intercontinental Exchange